Lophiotoma natalensis is a species of sea snail, a marine gastropod mollusk in the family Turridae, the turrids.

Description
The length of the shell attains 32.8 mm.

Distribution
This marine species occurs off KwaZulu-Natal, South Africa

References

 Bozzetti L. (2016). Lophiotoma natalensis (Gastropoda: Hypsogastropoda: Turridae) nuova specie del Natal Meridionale. Malacologia Mostra Mondiale. 92: 9-10

natalensis
Gastropods described in 2016